The Central Bohemian Region is an administrative unit of the Czech Republic, located in the central part of its historical region of Bohemia. Its administrative centre is in the Czech capital Prague, which lies in the centre of the region. However, the city is not part of it but is a region of its own.

The Central Bohemian Region is in the centre of Bohemia. In terms of area, it is the largest region in the Czech Republic, with 11,014 km2, almost 14% of the total area of the country. It surrounds the country's capital, Prague, and borders Liberec Region (in the north), Hradec Králové Region (northeast), Pardubice Region (east), Vysočina Region (southeast), South Bohemian Region (south), Plzeň Region (west) and Ústí nad Labem Region (northwest).

Administrative divisions
The Central Bohemian Region is divided into 12 districts:

Příbram District is the region's largest district in terms of area (15% of the total region's area), while Prague-West District is the smallest one (5%). In 2019, the region counted in total 1,144 municipalities where of 26 were municipalities with a delegated municipal office. 1,028 municipalities had less than 2,000 inhabitants and they accounted for 41% of the total population of the region. 82 municipalities had a status of town.

Geography

With an area of 11,014 km2, the Central Bohemian Region is the largest region of the Czech Republic, occupying 14% of its total area. The region has relatively diversified terrain. The highest point of the region is located on Tok hill (865 m) in Brdy Highlands in the southwestern part of the region. The lowest point of the region is situated on the water surface of the Elbe River (Czech: Labe) near Dolní Beřkovice.

The region is divided into two landscape types. The northeastern part is formed by the Polabí lowlands with a high share of land being used for agricultural purposes and deciduous forests. The south-western part of the region is hilly with coniferous and mixed forests.

Important rivers in the region are Labe, Vltava, Berounka, Jizera and Sázava. On the Vltava river, a series of nine dams (Czech: Vltavská kaskáda) was constructed throughout the 20th century.

The agricultural land accounts for 83.5% of all land in the region, which 11p.p. more than the national average. The highest share of the agricultural land can be found in Polabí, especially in Kolín and Nymburk districts.

There are a number of landscape parks located in the region. Křivoklátsko is the largest and most important landscape park in the region, being at the same time a UNESCO Biosphere Reservation. Another remarkable area is the Bohemian Karst, the largest karst area in the Czech republic, where the Koněprusy Caves (Czech: Koněpruské jeskyně) are located. Finally, a large part of Kokořínsko Landscape Park is situated in the Central Bohemian Region.

Population 
As of January 1, 2019 the Central Bohemian Region had 1,369,332 inhabitants and was the most populous region in the country. About 53% of the inhabitants lived in towns or cities. This is the lowest proportion among the regions of the Czech Republic.

Since the second half of the 1990s the areas surrounding Prague have been significantly influenced by suburbanization. High numbers of young people have moved to the region and since 2006 the region has been experiencing a natural population growth. In 2019, the average age in the region was 41.2 years, the lowest number among the regions in the Czech Republic.

The table shows cities and towns in the region that had more than 10,000 inhabitants (as of January 1, 2019):

Economy 
The Gross domestic product (GDP) of the region was 24.1 billion € in 2018, accounting for 11.6% of Czech economic output. GDP per capita adjusted for purchasing power was 25,300 € or 82% of the EU27 average in the same year. The GDP per employee was 84% of the EU average, which makes Central Bohemia one of the wealthiest regions in the Czech Republic. Six out of ten employees in the region work in the tertiary sector and the share of this sector on the total employment has been increasing over time. On the other hand, the share of primary and secondary sector has been decreasing. The unemployment rate in the region is in the long-term lower than the national average. As of December 31, 2012 the registered unemployment rate was 7.07%. However, there were considerable differences in the unemployment rate within the region. The lowest unemployment rate was in Prague-East District (3.35%) while the highest in Příbram District (10.10%). The average wage in the region in 2012 was CZK 24,749 (approximately EUR 965).

Industry 
The most important branches of industry in the region are mechanical engineering, chemical industry and food industry. Other significant industries are glass production, ceramics and printing. On the other hand, some traditional industries such as steel industry, leather manufacturing and coal mining have been declining in the recent period.

In 2006, 237 industrial companies with 100 or more employees were active in the region. A car manufacturer ŠKODA AUTO a.s. Mladá Boleslav became a company of nationwide importance. Another car manufacturer which is active in the region is TPCA Czech, s.r.o. in Kolín.

Agriculture 
The north-eastern part of the region has very favourable conditions for agriculture. The agriculture in the region is oriented especially in crop farming, namely the production of wheat, barley, sugar beet and in suburban areas also fruit farming, vegetable growing and floriculture. Since the beginning of the 1990s the employment in agriculture, forestry and fishing has been decreasing.

Transport 
The region has an advantageous position thanks to its proximity to the capital. A significant proportion of region's population commutes daily to Prague for work or to schools. Compared to other regions, the Central Bohemian region has the densest (and the most overloaded) transport network. The roads and railways connecting the capital with other regions all cross the Central Bohemian region.

Tourism
Central Bohemia official tourist board is based in Husova street 156/21 Prague 1 Old Town. The official website of Central bohemia is www.centralbohemia.eu (Currently under reconstruction). There are also social pages on Faceboook and Instagram.

Castles 

 Karlštejn Castle
 Kokořín Castle
 Konopiště
 Křivoklát Castle
 Lány
 Stranov

Photo gallery

References

External links

 Region statistics

 
Regions of the Czech Republic
NUTS 2 statistical regions of the European Union